Cam Woods (born April 27, 1976 in Montreal, Quebec) is a professional lacrosse player for the Toronto Rock of the National Lacrosse League. Woods tied with Taylor Wray for the Defensive Player of the Year Award in 2004, and was a 4 time all star (2002, 2004, 2007, 2009). Woods was named as the captain in his second season with the Albany Attack and then served as team captain for the next 7 seasons (3 Albany, 3 San Jose, 1 Chicago) before being traded to the Rock. Woods won his first NLL champions cup in 2011 with the Toronto Rock, to go along with his 2 Mann cups (2000 Brooklin Redmen, 2008 Brampton Excelsiors). Cam is a father of two children, Avalyn and Marchel Woods.

Woods announced his retirement from the NLL shortly before the 2014 NLL season, then came out of retirement to sign a practice roster agreement with the Toronto Rock on March 20, 2014.

Woods represented Canada playing in the World Indoor games, the Heritage Cup, and at the World Field Lacrosse Championships in Perth, Australia.

Statistics

NLL
Reference:

Awards

References

1976 births
Living people
Anglophone Quebec people
Canadian lacrosse players
Chicago Shamrox players
National Lacrosse League All-Stars
National Lacrosse League major award winners
San Jose Stealth players
Sportspeople from Montreal
Toronto Rock players